Henry Franklin-Bouillon (3 September 1870 - 12 September 1937) was a French politician.

Franklin-Bouillon was born in Jersey.  He began as a member of the Radical-Socialist Party, but belonged to its furthest right-wing: he advocated that the Radical-Socialists join with Poincaré's alliance of centre-right and right-wing parties to oppose communism and socialism and support punitive military policy towards Germany. In 1927 these stances prompted him to lead two-dozen like-minded deputies to quit the Radical-Socialist Party, forming a mid-sized centre-right parliamentary party of Independent Radicals, named the Social and Radical Left group.

He met Mustafa Kemal Atatürk in Ankara in 1921 and they became close friends. In 1922 he travelled through the devastated areas by the retreating Greek army and after visiting the burned town of Manisa, he declared that out of 11,000 houses in the city of Magnesia (Manisa) only 1,000 remained.

Franklin-Bouillon died aged 67 in Paris.

References

External links
 
 

1870 births
1937 deaths
Jersey emigrants
Radical Party (France) politicians
Social and Radical Left politicians
Independent Radical politicians
State ministers of France
Government ministers of France
Members of the 10th Chamber of Deputies of the French Third Republic
Members of the 11th Chamber of Deputies of the French Third Republic
Members of the 12th Chamber of Deputies of the French Third Republic
Members of the 13th Chamber of Deputies of the French Third Republic
Members of the 14th Chamber of Deputies of the French Third Republic
Members of the 15th Chamber of Deputies of the French Third Republic
French people of the Franco-Turkish War